Tapanee Aviation, Inc. is a Canadian aircraft manufacturer based in Mont-Saint-Michel, Quebec. The company specializes in the design and manufacture of STOL light aircraft in the form of plans and kits for amateur construction.

Tapanee Aviation began producing wing replacement kits for the Zenith STOL CH 701 featuring retractable leading-edge slats. Later the company designed a new fuselage to go with the wings, which became the Tapanee Pegazair-80 and the development Tapanee Pegazair-100. Later the two-seat Tapanee Levitation 2 and four-seat Tapanee Levitation 4 models were added, although the Levitation 2 is no longer offered.

Aircraft

References

External links

Aircraft manufacturers of Canada
Ultralight aircraft
Homebuilt aircraft